Philippe Malaud (2 October 1925, in Paris – 14 October 2007, in Paris) was a French diplomat and politician. He graduated from the École nationale d'administration in 1956. From 1968 until 1978, he was a member of the Independent Republicans. 

He was the minister of civil service between 1973 and 1974 and was Minister of Information for a short period of time. Between 1973 and 1981, he was a member of the Parliament. Then between 1984 and 1989, he was a Member of the European Parliament.

1925 births
2007 deaths
École nationale d'administration alumni
French Ministers of Civil Service
Ministers of Information of France
Knights of the Ordre national du Mérite